The Hong Kong Island geographical constituency was one of the five geographical constituencies in the elections for the Legislative Council of Hong Kong from 1998 to 2021. It was established in 1998 for the first SAR Legislative Council election and was abolished under the 2021 overhaul of the Hong Kong electoral system. In the 2016 Legislative Council election, it elected six members of the Legislative Council using the Hare quota of party-list proportional representation. The constituency covered all the four districts on the Hong Kong Island, namely, Central and Western, Eastern, Southern and Wan Chai. In 2020, it had 707,277 registered voters.

History 

The single-constituency single-vote system was replaced by the party-list proportional representation system for the first SAR Legislative Council election designed by Beijing to reward the weaker pro-Beijing candidates and dilute the electoral strength of the majority pro-democrats. Four seats were allocated to Hong Kong Island consisting the districts of Central and Western, Wan Chai, Eastern and Southern in 1998. The pro-Beijing Democratic Alliance for the Betterment of Hong Kong (DAB) managed to win a seat with nearly 30 per cent of the total votes as a result, while the rest were taken by the pro-democrats.

In the 2000 Legislative Council election, the DAB gained one more seat with Choy So-yuk who had a strong base in the Hokkien community in North Point when an extra seat was added to the constituency, while Cyd Ho who ran in the New Territories East replaced Christine Loh who retired. However, DAB candidate Cheng Kai-nam soon gave up his seat after the election due to corruption allegations. The vacancy was taken up by pro-democracy nonpartisan barrister Audrey Eu in the 2000 Hong Kong Island by-election.

In the 2004 Legislative Council election, Legislative Council President Rita Fan ran in Hong Kong Island when the number of the seats in the constituency increased to six seats and the Election Committee constituency was abolished. The pro-democrats launched the "1+1=4" strategy, aiming at winning two seats with each of the two tickets. However, the last minute emergency call by Martin Lee proved to a miscalculation, with his Democratic Party ticket receiving more votes than he needed, at the expense of the Eu–Ho ticket where Cyd Ho narrowly defeated by DAB's Choy So-yuk with 815 votes, less than 0.5 per cent of the vote share

DAB chairman Ma Lik's death in 2007 triggered the 2007 Hong Kong Island by-election, where the pro-democracy and pro-Beijing camps each fielded former senior government officials against each other. Former Chief Secretary for Administration Anson Chan won the crowded-fielded pro-democracy primary, while former Secretary for Security Regina Ip who was the face of the 2003 Basic Law Article 23 legislation was supported by the pro-Beijing parties. Receiving wide attention, Anson Chan eventually beat Regina Ip with 55–43 vote share.

The 2008 Legislative Council election saw veteran Democrats Martin Lee and Yeung Sum both stepping down from their offices, and were succeeded by veteran District Councillor Kam Nai-wai. The Democrats' dominance was eclipsed by the newly established Civic Party with Audrey Eu and Tanya Chan ticket who topped the popular votes. Former DAB chairman Jasper Tsang also switched from Kowloon West to Hong Kong Island and was later on elected the Legislative Council President, succeeding retiring Rita Fan. Regina Ip who was defeated less than a year ago also won a seat, while Cyd Ho made a comeback by regaining a seat. Over the 2012 constitutional reform package, the Civic Party launched the "Five Constituencies Referendum" and which each legislator of the five geographical constituencies resigned to trigger a de facto referendum on the reform proposal. Tanya Chan resigned from the office in January 2010 and re-elected in the May by-election with a low turnout due to the government and pro-Beijing boycott of the poll.

The deal on the modified constitutional reform proposal struck by the moderate democrats and the Beijing authorities expanded the number of the geographical constituency seats from 30 to 35, where the seats in Hong Kong Island were increased to seven. To win an extra seat, the DAB launched an offensive strategy by splitting its ticket into two, led by Jasper Tsang and Christopher Cheung respectively. While the its sister organisation Hong Kong Federation of Trade Unions (FTU) also fielded its ticket for the first time, led by veteran legislator Wong Kwok-hing. Civic Party's strategy of fielding a ticket consisting of Chan Ka-lok and Tanya Chan, hoping to win two seats with one ticket with Tanya Chan boosting the vote as a second candidate eventually failed, which split the pro-democracy votes with the radical People Power and benefited Wong Kwok-hing, while former legislator Sin Chung-kai retained a seat for the Democrats. The pro-Beijing camp as a result gained the majority of the seats for the first time with four seats against pro-democrats' three.

The constituency was reduced to six seats in the 2016 Legislative Council election due to the  reapportionment. The seats were even split between the pro-democracy and pro-Beijing camps. Localist Demosistō chairman Nathan Law which gained his fame in the 2014 Occupy protests was elected alongside Tanya Chan of the Civic Party and Hui Chi-fung of the Democratic Party. While veteran Regina Ip of the New People's Party was re-elected with newly elected DAB's Horace Cheung and FTU's Kwok Wai-keung. Nathan Law was later disqualified from the office in July 2017 over this oath-taking manner. The vacancy was narrowly won by former Democrat Au Nok-hin in the 2018 Hong Kong Island by-election after Demosistō's Agnes Chow was barred from running. Au was later unseated by the court in December 2019, as the court viewed Chow's disqualification was unlawful.

Return members
Below are all the members since the creation of the Hong Kong Island constituency. The number of seats allocated to Hong Kong Island has been increased from four to six between 1998 and 2016 due to the enlargement.

Summary of seats won

Vote share summary

Election results 
The constituency was set up in 1998 election when the largest remainder method (with Hare quota) of the proportional representative electoral system was introduced, replacing four single-member constituencies of the 1995 election. 4, 5, 6, and 7 members were returned from this constituency in the 1998, 2000, 2004 and 2012 elections respectively. No change of boundary had been made throughout since 1998.

2010s

2000s

1990s

References

External links
 Legislative Council of Hong Kong

Constituency
Constituency
Constituencies established in 1998
Constituencies disestablished in 2021
Island
Island
Constituency